Thomas Hughes Herring (August 7, 1812 – July 1, 1874) was an American politician who served in the New Jersey State Senate from 1857 to 1859. He served as President of the Senate in 1859.

Born in Albany, New York to Thomas and Lucy (Olds) Herring, he graduated from the Albany Academy. Herring went to work as a clerk at Conkling & Herring, the firm of his brother and brother-in-law. At age 21, he was made a partner in the firm. In 1841, Herring retired from the business, but remained active in investing. He became the largest stockholder in the Northern Railroad of New Jersey, serving as its president from 1859 to 1869.

Herring was a resident of Ridgefield, New Jersey.

References

1812 births
1874 deaths
19th-century American railroad executives
New Jersey state senators
Politicians from Albany, New York
People from Ridgefield, New Jersey
Politicians from Bergen County, New Jersey
Presidents of the New Jersey Senate
The Albany Academy alumni
19th-century American politicians